Charlie Hoover is an American sitcom which aired on Fox from November 9 to December 28, 1991, starring Tim Matheson in the lead role and Sam Kinison, Lucy Webb and Bill Maher.

Synopsis
Charlie Hoover (Tim Matheson) is a man who just reached middle age when one day the voice within his head materializes in the form of Hugh (Sam Kinison), a foot-high miniature alter ego. Hugh guides Charlie on the path to getting his life in order.

Episodes

References

External links

Interview with Sam's brother Bill Kinison at Bullz-Eye.com
"Sam Kinison’s Wild Ride" at LasVegasWeekly.com

1990s American sitcoms
1991 American television series debuts
1991 American television series endings
English-language television shows
Fox Broadcasting Company original programming
Television series by Sony Pictures Television
Television shows set in New York City